The University of Queensland Union (UQ Union) is a student organisation established to provide service, support and representation to the students of The University of Queensland. It remains the largest student representative body in Australia and the Southern Hemisphere . The Union oversees approximately $25 million in revenue each financial year.

Student services
The UQU operates most of the campus's student eateries, cafes, bookshops in addition to the university bar and cinema. These facilities and services are concentrated at the Union Complex at the St Lucia campus.

The UQU organises the university's orientation week ("O-Week") activities, regular barbecues and free bands, as well as a range of larger events, such as Oktoberfest and, as of 2016, the annual Neon Party (previously the Toga Party from 2009–16). Recently the UQU introduced a club funding scheme that supports over 200 clubs and societies, including faculty, ethnic, and a variety of social groups; sporting groups, however, fall under the domain of UQ Sport. The UQU also provides a free legal service to university students. In addition, it also organises the weekly Wednesday markets at the St Lucia campus.

One of the other roles of the UQU is to see that minority groups on campus are adequately supported. To this extent, it provides Queer Spaces and Women's Spaces at St Lucia campus and Gatton campuses, and a Abilities Collective Space at the St Lucia Campus. UQU has queer, women's, environment, (dis)abilities and Indigenous collectives to represent their respective interests. UQU operates Queer, Women's, Environment, Disabilities, Indigenous, International Student, Postgraduate, and Student Rights departments to work with collectives and students directly on advocacy and wellbeing campaigns.

Clubs and societies
The UQU oversees over 220 student run Clubs and Societies, with a combined membership across these clubs of approximately 36,000 students. Clubs fall under one of four broad categories based on where they derive their membership base. These categories include: Faculty/School; International Students; Colleges; and General Interest.

Clubs play a vital role on campus, with the majority of social events at UQ being run by these student groups.

Student publications
Semper Floreat (Latin: "May it always flourish") is the student newspaper of the University of Queensland. It has been published continuously by the University of Queensland Union (UQU) since 1932, when it began as a fortnightly newsletter of only a few pages, produced by one editor. It was previously published as Queensland University Magazine and Galmahra. The Student Union also published a Songbook for Commemoration celebrations, featuring songs celebrating the Faculties and Professors of the time. The Songbook went by a number of names, including Whack-Ho. By the 1960s songs were omitted from the publication, replaced by articles and cartoons reflecting student culture of the time.

Executives
Each year, the students of the University of Queensland optionally participate in electing a student executive to the UQ Union, these elections have been occurring since the inception of the union in the 1910's and provide students with a say in who runs the peak student representative body for all campuses. The UQU executive have predominantly been run by groups of students aligned with the major political parties of Australia and their historical predecessors. For much of the Union's history voting was done for individual positions not group tickets, in some years, such as 2003, this resulted in the President being from a Labor Left ticket and the Secretary and Treasurer from a Liberal ticket.

Presidents

Vice Presidents

Student Collectives 
Representing minority, special interest and other community groups on campus, UQU’s collectives offer students at the University of Queensland the opportunity to meet like-minded peers and benefit from a supportive environment, networking opportunities and safer spaces on campus. The collectives are managed by peer elected committees and completely free to join.

Association of Postgraduate Students (APS) 
In 2011, UQ postgraduate students formed a postgraduate collective within the UQU, called the UQU Association of Postgraduate Students (APS). This new body has been in regular contact with The Council of Australian Postgraduate Associations (CAPA) and sent a representative to the 2011 CAPA annual conference in Sydney. APS caters to the needs of around 21,000 postgraduate students at the University of Queensland, it aims to create a platform for all postgraduate students to engage socially and professionally with students from other schools, faculties, nationalities, cultures and general interests. All Postgraduate students at UQ are automatically members of the Association.

APS Presidents

Disability Collective 
The Disability Collective is concerned with the advocacy, support and social connectedness of students at UQ who experience disability, chronic illness, mental illness, neurodiversity and/or are deaf. The collective also exists to offer peer support for its members and to raise awareness of issues surrounding disability throughout the greater university body, and in the wider community. The collective has rooms on campus as well as online communities which provide safe spaces for students to ask questions, connect with others, and access support and advocacy. The collective is committed to working with the university administration and teaching staff, and UQ’s Disability, Diversity and Inclusion Advisors (DDIA), to advocate for student rights, refer students to appropriate support services, and help students navigate life at university. All students who identify as someone who experience disability, chronic illness, mental illness, neurodiversity and/or are deaf can automatically become a member of the collective.

Environment Collective 
The Environment collective is for students, staff and the general public. It offers an inclusive platform to share ideas and contribute to UQU policy and is committed to encouraging sustainable practices on campus, promoting greater awareness of, and increasing students’ interaction with Queensland’s native flora and fauna. The Environment Collective hosts a range of events throughout the year. Some of its previously most successful events have included the Waterfall Crawl, Earth Day Breakfast and No Meat Mondays. All UQ students are open to become automatic members of the collective.

Goorie Berrimpa 
Goorie Berrimpa meaning “Meeting Place” in the local tribe, Turrbal language, is a UQU collective focused on the indigenous representation of students on-campus. Goorie as the collective is commonly known by, aims to provide a sense of belonging for all Indigenous students studying at the University of Queensland and bring culture and education together. Goorie Berrimpa holds a number of events throughout the year including the annual NAIDOC Ball with guest speakers and performers; as well as NITESG (National Indigenous Tertiary Education Student Games) as well as beginning and ending Semester Socials. All UQ Students who identify as Indigenous or Torres Strait Islander have access to automatic membership to the collective.

International Collective 
The UQU International Students Collective is a student collective brought to you by UQU, and is open to all international students and anyone interested in cultural diversity. The collective understands that for many international students, leaving friends, family and  country behind, to step into an entirely new country can be challenging. The collective provides guidance and support for international students throughout this journey and advocate on behalf of international students to the University of Queensland on all important matters, for improved university experiences and student services. All international students as well as any UQ students interested in cultural diversity have access to automatic membership.

Queer Collective 
The UQU Queer Collective (UQU QC) is a community group at the University of Queensland for members of the UQ LGBTQIA+ community. The UQU queer community under its many names has seen the decriminalisation of homosexuality, the introduction of the Anti-Discrimination Act, the Marriage Equality acts, the hosting of numerous national conference, and hundreds of events. Currently, the UQU Queer Collective offer regular events, advocacy campaigns, mutual aid, a community, friendship and support. All members of the UQ community who identify as queer and/or LGBTQIA+ are automatic members of the Queer Collective.

Womens Collective 
The UQU Women’s Collective (UQU WC) is an autonomous group on the University of Queensland campus, non-affiliated with any political party, external organisation or values-driven belief. The goal of the Women’s Collective is to represent and advocate for women on campus through a range of events and campaigns. The UQU Women’s Collective aims to engage people with each other as feminists and feminist theory as a whole, run events and to raise consciousness and meets regularly to discuss feminist affairs. In addition, the Women’s collective regularly hosts events such as the annual International Women’s Day Breakfast, small social events, and networking opportunities and run campaigns to engage students on campus and educate people in regards to current feminist issues. All UQ Students who identify as women or non-binary have automatic membership to the collective.

Politics

1960s
In 1965, women students from the University of Queensland chained themselves to the bar of Treasury and Regatta hotel to protest against sex discrimination

In 1966, the Vietnam Action Committee formed as a University-based Civil Liberties and Vietnam-oriented action group. At a footpath protest in March against the Vietnam War, 31 were arrested. Students later hosted a conference on South-East Asia at UQ organised by off-campus peace groups.

In May 1967, the Union’s Civil Liberties Coordinating Committee formed to fight restrictive sections of the Traffic Act. In June, the CLCC gave the government an ultimatum with a deadline of 11 July for sections of the Traffic Act to be repealed, but in July, the deadline was extended to 5 September, mainly due to negotiations the Student Union President and State Government.

On the 4th of September, Premier Frank Nicklin promised a decision on the ultimatum. A rally and march on this issue was postponed to the 8th of September. The Nicklin Government made an offer on the 7th, but it was found unsatisfactory. The following day, 4,000 people marched to the city. 2,000 of them sat down in Roma Street. 114 were arrested with police violence.

A demonstration was called by the Trades and Labour Council of Queensland to protest against police treatment of university students and staff in Roma Street, Brisbane during the 8th September protest march.

1970s
On 4 September 1977 Joh Bjelke-Petersen, the Premier of Queensland announced that "the day of the political street march is over. Anybody who holds a street march, spontaneous or otherwise, will know that they are acting illegally. Don’t bother to apply for a permit you won’t get one. That's Government policy now."

On 12 September 1977, the UQ Union marched on campus and was stopped at the gates of the University by 300 Queensland police officers. Some students walked along the footpath to a rally of 5,000 workers on Trade Union Rights. Wharf workers marched to the rally in Roma Street forum.

This was followed by a march on the 22nd of September, which went off campus and regathered in King George Square. In total, seven people were arrested, including the Australian Union of Students’ representative at UQ. All but one of these had been attending meetings at the University of Queensland of the newly formed group to fight the ban. By that last arrest, 20 people had been arrested on the King George Square steps. Another 12 were arrested later at parliament house.

The women arrested were strip-searched in the watchhouse that night in the presence of male police. Maris, a young student and member of the CLCC, organised a defence for all the arrested people in the courts and a few were acquitted. This was the beginning of 3,000 arrests of 2,000 people (some were arrested on several occasions) and court appearances which would continue unabated for 2 years – every time there was a political street march.

From 4 September 1977 to July 1979 2,000 people were arrested, there were 3,000 arrests with the largest of 418 people being arrested in a single afternoon of 22 October 1977.

Establishment of Women's Collective
In 1977, the UQ Union, was the first student union in the country to appoint a part time paid Women’s Rights Organiser. An early campaign sought to get the Student Union to adopt policy supporting women’s abortion rights.  A student referendum on the issue was unsuccessful at that time, though later the Union would adopt a pro-choice stance.

A campaign about women's safety on campus raised awareness of the prevalence of sexual assault and rape on campus – it was some years, however, before the university responded.  The Women's Rights Committee also campaigned against sexual harassment of students by some academic and teaching staff.  They campaigned successfully for the withdrawal of student union funding for a student club that printed a newsletter that incited violence against women and girls.  They successfully called for the reinstatement by the Student Union of a woman cleaner who had been fired without sufficient reason.

When the Women's Rights Room became too small for their meetings, the women asked the Union for a larger room.  The request was refused so the women and a couple of supporters, occupied the room and moved the furniture."

Recent history
1991–1992, the Union was run under the umbrella of the Liberal (or Young Liberal) party.

1994–2007, the Union was almost exclusively under the control of parties aligned with the Labor party, usually the left leaning wing. Liberal students regained full control for a single year in 1996 and won a majority of the split executive in 2003.

2008–2013, the Union was run by a party under the banner "Fresh" (Liberal National Party of Qld). During this time, UQU ends its accreditation with the National Union of Students, making it the first student association in the Group of Eight universities to have done so.

2014–2017, the Union was run by Reform (a coalition of Labor's left and right factions), during which significant opposition came from Lift (independents) and Thrive (LNP).

On 14 September 2017, after intense divisions between Labor's Left and Right factions, the Reform ticket announced their disbanding. The Labor Right faction formed a separate, independent coalition supported by a faction of Young Liberals, as well as some Greens and Independent students, to contest the elections under a new ticket named Focus. The Labor Left faction attempted to continue as 'Reform', however, they failed to lodge their nominations correctly. Owing to some administrative errors, Reform's Union Council ticket did not appear above the line.

After the errors made during the nomination process, the Reform ticket announced on Facebook that they intended to withdraw from the contesting the 2017 Student Union Elections. In the same post, they endorsed the Socialist Alternative ticket 'Student Action'. The 'Reform' ticket remained on the ballot papers for the Union Executive and the Union Newspaper, but the ticket did not run a ground campaign during the elections. The newly formed 'Focus' ticket was elected in a landslide.

In 2018, the Labor Left faction re-formed as 'Momentum'.

A referendum was planned to be held simultaneously with the 2018 election, but was announced in a manner inconsistent with the regulations. The referendum was thus postponed, and held instead during the last week of exams, and a regulatory amendment made to allow voting online. However, of the 6383 votes counted, 2218 were "against" votes were submitted from a single non-University IP address, significantly contributing to none of the referendum questions passing. One of the questions of the referendum related to eligibility to hold positions for elected officers. Several students who had been elected were not eligible to hold office under the current constitution, but would have been had the question passed. As such, these students vacated their positions immediately upon assuming office at the conclusion of the Annual General Meeting. These vacancies lasted until the first meeting of the newly elected council.

In 2019, Labor Right split from the Focus deal, and attempted to create a new ticket with Labor Left. Near the close of nominations, the newly re-formed Labor group were advised that another electoral group had reserved their intended name, 'Together'. The Liberal faction within Focus successfully nominated under the name 'Real'. The Returning Officer extended the nominations deadline to allow the Labor group to resubmit their forms with a new name (they chose 'Empower'), but the campaign manager for the new 'Together' ticket appealed the decision to extend the nominations deadline, taking this appeal to the Electoral Tribunal. Labor were supported in defending against this appeal by their former Focus allies in 'Real', but the Electoral Tribunal found against both the major parties, and in favour of 'Together', finding that the regulations did not grant the Returning Officer the power to extend the nomination window. Empower campaigners began the election on a platform of Real having sabotaged the election, but soon changed tactics to a more clear-cut Below the Line campaign.

Following voting week, the REAL executive ticket was elected in a landslide by a margin of 63% - 37%.  This marked the first time in 6 years that no member of the Australian Labor Party held an elected position on the University of Queensland Union Executive.

Following the 2022 student elections, Rebuild was elected to a third term in office and received its largest executive ticket majority with 62% of the primary vote and a 73% - 27% TPP split against the Young LNP-ran Together. This marks the largest single party primary vote since REAL's election in 2019 and the largest two-party preferred split since Fresh's infamous re-election in 2012.

Union council composition

2019 
In 2019, the UQ Union Council was made up of 23 student representatives elected from five electoral groups, spanning from five different student factions, plus an independent.

2020 
In 2020, the UQ Union Council was made up of 23 student representatives elected from six unique electoral groups, spanning five student factions.

2021 
The 110th UQ Union Council is made up of 24 members from 7 electoral groups. Ji Davis was elected Council Chair for 2021 at the February Union Council Meeting.

2022 

The 2022 UQ Union Council is made up of 24 members from 8 electoral groups. Samuel Adams of Black Flag was elected Council Chair for 2022 at the February Union Council Meeting.

2023 

The 2023 UQ Union Council will be made up of 23 members from 8 electoral groups.

Controversies

2012 election

In 2012, there was controversy surrounding the conduct of the annual student elections. The incumbents made rule changes that resulted in other teams submitting their nominations in an incorrect manner. This specifically related to last minute changes to union election rules removing the protection for previously used party names, which resulted in campaign material for opposition parties becoming unusable. This resulted in all other opposition parties (including "Pulse" and "I just want my voucher") having their names invalidated. These Allegations were denied by the current President.

Minutes and a recording from the 101st UQU Council meeting show that new regulations were brought in on 10 August. The recording shows that an objection was raised by Councillor Flynn Rush on procedural fairness and constitutional grounds, though this was circumvented through amending the factual basis for the objection. The incumbents did not give the requisite 5 'clear days' notice as per the UQU constitution. The regulation changes went ahead regardless. They were not available until elections and nominations opened.

The 2012 union president stated that members of the Pulse party "can complain all they want" but had 12 months notice on the introduction of new regulations on the use of registered ticket names, and that the 'last-minute' changes to the regulations were to different provisions (namely the timing of the electoral process to reduce it from 4 weeks to 3 as well as adding an entirely new process/form for nominations).

In response to the situation, an activist group titled 'DEMOCRACY 4 UQU' was started by a number of Fresh opposition groups concerned about how the measures introduced affected the student elections. Their goal was to correct what they perceive to be an unbalanced and unfair election process.

UQ deputy Vice Chancellor (academic) Professor Mick McManus, said in response to the situation that UQ was concerned that this issue had a significant impact on students and would be considered in full and addressed appropriately, and that the university would work to resolve the issues. On 22 August, the University announced that the current union administration would be required to provide access to the constitution and changes to it, financial reports, and notices and minutes of meetings held under the current union on its website. Graeme Orr, Professor of Law at the University of Queensland, has pointed out in a radio interview that the power of the electoral tribunal convened to assess whether the elections were held properly was limited only to whether or not the electoral rules were violated, not whether they are valid or were created in accordance to union policy.

On 24 August, the University declared that in line with their funding agreement with the University Of Queensland Student Union, they would carry out an audit into the management of finances. The results of this audit are available online.

On 29 August, hundreds of students gathered at UQ's great court to protest against Fresh and call for democracy.

On 3 December, the annual general meeting of the UQU was cancelled after those calling it neglected to inform students and most members of their own executive, resulting in too few people present for the meeting to be quorate. An outgoing Vice-President, who had defected to an opposition political ticket, spoke briefly about the conduct of FRESH, raising concerns that the locking out of the opposition tickets was an act of hypocrisy given that FRESH made multiple electoral reforms early in their term to improve electoral participation.

Notable alumni
The UQU has produced a number of notable alumni including Governors-General of Australia, CEOs, Chief Justices of Australia and State Premiers.

Sir Thomas Groom, UQU President 1928, Lord Mayor of Brisbane
Sir Harry Gibbs GCMG, AC, KBE, QC, UQU President 1936, Chief Justice of the High Court
Sir Walter Campbell AC QC, UQU President 1942, Governor, Supreme Court Judge, Chancellor of the University of Queensland
Barry Murphy, UQU President 1963, CEO of Caltex
Anna Bligh, UQU Women's Officer 1981, Premier of Queensland
Paul Lucas (politician), UQU Treasurer 1983, Deputy Premier and Attorney General of Queensland.
Robert Wensley, UQU President, Deputy Chancellor of the University of Queensland.
Fleur Kingham, UQU President 1983, UQU Secretary 1982, Queensland District Court Judge.
Jillann Farmer, UQU President 1986, Medical Director of the United Nations
Murray Watt, UQU President 1994, QLD Labor Senator
Julie-Ann Campbell, UQU President 2007, QLD Labor Party State Secretary

See also
University of Queensland Debating Society
Union College
University of Queensland Intercollege Council
UQU Schonell Theatre
National Association of Australian University Colleges
Semper Floreat

References

External links
UQ Union

Students' unions in Australia
University of Queensland